Giuseppe Ferrari may refer to:

Giuseppe Ferrari (philosopher) (1812–1876), Italian philosopher
Giuseppe Ferrari (painter) (1840–1905), Italian painter
Giuseppe Carlo Ferrari (1910–1987), Italian footballer and coach